Randall Bal (born November 14, 1980) is an American swimmer who specialized in the backstroke.  He is a former world record holder in the 50-meter backstroke (long and short course).

He has won a total of thirteen medals in major international competition, five golds, six silvers, and two bronze spanning the World Championships, the Pan American Games, and the  Pan Pacific Championships.

Personal

Bal was born in Fair Oaks, California in 1980, the son of Adrian and Carol Bal.  His younger sister, Tamara, swam at UCLA. Bal attended Bella Vista High School where he graduated in 1999. From there, he swam for Stanford University, class of 2003, and graduated with a degree in psychology.

Swimming career

At the 2008 FINA Short Course World Championships in Manchester, he took the silver medal in the 100 Back, but he finished a surprising sixth (his PB would have won the event) in the 50 Back. He won another silver on the medley relay. He was the top qualifier in the 100 Back at the 2008 Olympic Trials, in both the preliminaries and semi-finals, with the then-third fastest time ever in the semis (53.09), but he faded to fourth in the finals, finishing behind Aaron Peirsol, who set a new World Record of 52.89, Matt Grevers, and Ryan Lochte. In 2008 Randall broke both the World Record (24.33 LCM & 22.87 SCM) in the 50 backstroke and missed the 100 LCM backstroke World Record by .04 of a second. He is currently training in northern California.

See also
 List of Pan American Games records in swimming
 List of Stanford University people
 List of World Aquatics Championships medalists in swimming (men)
 World record progression 50 metres backstroke

References

External links
 
 
 

1980 births
Living people
Latter Day Saints from California
American male backstroke swimmers
American male freestyle swimmers
World record setters in swimming
People from Fair Oaks, California
Stanford Cardinal men's swimmers
Swimmers at the 2007 Pan American Games
World Aquatics Championships medalists in swimming
Medalists at the FINA World Swimming Championships (25 m)
Pan American Games gold medalists for the United States
Pan American Games medalists in swimming
Medalists at the 2007 Pan American Games
20th-century American people
21st-century American people